Litarachna lopezae is a species of aquatic mite in the order Trombidiformes. Found around depths of 70 meters in the Mona Passage, Puerto Rico, the species was named after Jennifer Lopez.

See also
 List of organisms named after famous people (born 1950–present)

References

Trombidiformes
Animals described in 2014
Arthropods of Puerto Rico
Jennifer Lopez